Senator Hodge may refer to:

Derek Hodge (1941–2011), Senate of the U.S. Virgin Islands
Frederick A. Hodge (1853–1922), Minnesota State Senate
George Baird Hodge (1828–1892), Kentucky State Senate
Mary Hodge (born 1946), Colorado State Senate
Orlando J. Hodge (1828–1912), Connecticut State Senate

See also
Senator Hodges (disambiguation)